Cephalodiscus nusplingensis is an extinct hemichordate species from the Upper Jurassic of southwestern Germany.

References

nusplingensis